Mironovka is a rural locality (a settlement) in Zyryanovsky Selsoviet, Zarinsky District, Altai Krai, Russia. The population was 98 as of 2013. There are 5 streets.

Geography 
Mironovka is located 59 km northeast of Zarinsk (the district's administrative centre) by road. Zyryanovka is the nearest rural locality.

References 

Rural localities in Zarinsky District